Piattino is an Italian restaurant in Portland, Oregon's Pearl District, in the United States.

Description 
Piattino is an Italian restaurant in the northwest Portland's Pearl District. According to Thrillist, the restaurant serves "Italian takes on tapas", wood-fired pizzas, desserts, and cocktails. The opening menu included 11 small plates (including mussels with tomatillo and cilantro, shellfish arancini with shrimp and lobster, and a half hen with peperonata, honey, and fennel pollen), a mushroom-and-salami calzone, and 5 pasta options including pork belly tortelli and fettuccine pimiento with wild boar ragu. The restaurant's seats 52 people, including 40 at wood tables, 6 at the oven counter, and 6 at the bar.

History 
Owner Kooroush Shearan opened Piattino in September 2013, replacing Mediterranean restaurant Shiraz Grill. Michael Campbell was the opening chef.

See also 

 List of Italian restaurants

References

External links 

 
 
 Piattino at Zomato

2013 establishments in Oregon
Italian restaurants in Portland, Oregon
Pearl District, Portland, Oregon
Restaurants established in 2013